Brad Watters (born 1971) is a sports executive who was president of the Toronto Argonauts and Toronto Rock. He ran Ottawa Rebel and the Ottawa Renegades.

Biography
He grew up in Leaside, Toronto, studied at Huron University College part of the University of Western Ontario and is the son of Bill Watters.

He bought the Ontario Raiders in 1999 and moved them to Toronto where they became Toronto Rock. From 2001 to 2003, Brad Waters owned the Ottawa Rebel National Lacrosse League franchise. After it became inactive, he worked to establish the Ottawa Renegades Canadian Football League team. He ran it until 2005 when Bernard Glieberman bought the team.

Throughout his time in sports management he was in charge of his own company, BJW Sports Inc. From 2007, he was joint team president of the Toronto Argonauts with Pinball Clemons. In 2009, he was succeeded by Bob Nicholson who was previously team president of the Argonauts from 1995 to 1999. He went on to return as president and chief executive officer of Toronto Rock National Lacrosse League team.

References

1971 births
Living people
University of Western Ontario alumni
Businesspeople from Toronto
Toronto Argonauts team presidents
Canadian Football League executives